Innset may refer to the following places:

Places
Innset, Troms, a village in Bardu municipality in Troms county, Norway
Innset, Trøndelag, a village in Rennebu municipality in Trøndelag county, Norway
Innset Church, a church in Rennebu municipality in Trøndelag county, Norway